Na Seokju (1892-1926) was a Korean nationalist made famous for his attack on the Oriental Development Company, an organization set up by Imperial Japan as part of its imperial expansion and the development of its colonies. Korea had been declared a Japanese protectorate in 1905 and annexed in 1910.

Life
Na Seokju originally grew up as a farmer in Chaeryong County, Hwanghae Province. As he got older, he moved to Manchuria in order to receive military training for four years. After completing his training, Na Seokju returned to his hometown and worked as the manager of a local store. During this period, Na was also involved in underground political movements against the Japanese colonial rule of Korea; during the March 1st Movement (1919) in occupied Korea, he helped to organize local protest efforts and raise funds for Korean nationalist militant groups.

In 1920 Na Seokju was found responsible for killing multiple Japanese authorities, as well as a Korean man believed to be a conspirator with the Japanese, resulting in Na's decision to flee to Shanghai on September 22, 1920, to escape the charges. While in China Na served as a bodyguard for the Provisional Government of Korea, which had been formed in reaction to Japanese suppression of Korean protesters and activists after the March 1st Movement. Na also visited Tianjin while in China in order to meet with Kim Chang-suk, who asked him to blow up the Oriental Development Company, Joseon Bank, and Industrial Bank of Japan buildings upon his return to Korea.

Attack
On December 26, 1926, Na Seokju travelled south from Manchuria towards Seoul. After using various disguises to get across the Chinese-Korean border and through different checkpoints, Na finally arrived in Seoul on December 28. He first went to the Industrial Bank, where he detonated a grenade near the loan department, destroying it. From there, he made his way to the Oriental Development Company building, where he shot multiple Japanese office workers within the building; Na then attempted to detonate another grenade in order to kill several higher-level employees, but failed when the grenade proved to be a dud. After leaving the second building, Na attempted to escape the premises, killing a Japanese police officer in the process.

Na was pursued by the Japanese police force. In order to avoid being apprehended, Na Seokju shot himself three times in the chest, and died later that day after being rushed to hospital.

Legacy
Although some have labelled Na Seokju a terrorist for his actions, particularly his attacks on non-military targets, others have celebrated his efforts to liberate colonial-era Korea from its Japanese invaders. Na was given posthumous honors, and acknowledged as a nationalist hero, with a statue of him erected in Seoul.

References

1892 births
1926 deaths
People from Chaeryong County
Korean independence activists
1926 suicides
Suicides by firearm in Korea
Multiple gunshot suicides